Val-de-Marne ("Vale of the Marne") is a department of France located in the Île-de-France region. Named after the river Marne, it is situated in the Grand Paris metropolis to the southeast of the City of Paris. In 2019, Val-de-Marne had a population of 1,407,124.

Its INSEE and postcode number is 94.

Geography 
Val-de-Marne is, together with Seine-Saint-Denis and Hauts-de-Seine, one of three small departments in Île-de-France that form a ring around Paris, known as the Petite Couronne ("inner ring"). Since 1 January 2016, Val-de-Marne is included in the Métropole du Grand Paris.

Principal towns

The most populous commune is Vitry-sur-Seine; the prefecture Créteil is the second-most populous. As of 2019, there are 5 communes with more than 60,000 inhabitants:

Administration

Val-de-Marne is made up of 3 departmental arrondissements and 47 communes:

Arrondissement ofL'Haÿ-les-Roses

Arrondissement ofCréteil

Arrondissement ofNogent-sur-Marne

History 
Val-de-Marne was created in January 1968, through the implementation of a law passed in July 1964.   Positioned to the south-east of the Paris ring road (and the line of the old city walls), it was formed from the southern-eastern part of the (previously much larger) Seine department, together with a small portion taken from the broken-up department of Seine-et-Oise.

Demographics
Population development since 1881:

Place of birth of residents

Politics

The president of the Departmental Council is Olivier Capitanio, elected in July 2021.

Presidential elections 2nd round

Current National Assembly Representatives

Tourism

See also
 Communes of the Val-de-Marne department
Church of Saint-Cyr-Sainte-Julitte, Villejuif

References

External links

  Prefecture
  Departemental Council
  Citizen Blog

 
1968 establishments in France
Departments of Île-de-France
States and territories established in 1968